Zone is the third and final studio album by Australian music group Southern Sons. The album was released in Australia in 1996. The album was re-released in late 1996 with an alternate track listing and three live tracks. All the tracks were written by guitarist Phil Buckle with various contributions. The album was also released in the Australian iTunes Store as a digital download in 2010. Colin Hay appears  as guest on track "Don't Tell Me What's Right"

Track listing
 "Zone" (J. Jones, P. Buckle, T. Deluca) – 4:23
 "Living Without You" (J. Jones, P. Buckle) – 3:38
 "Don't Tell Me What's Right" (P. Buckle) – 3:57
 "Seeds" (P. Buckle, J. Jones, T. Deluca) – 3:21
 "Trust In Me" (P. Buckle) – 5:01
 "We Are One" (P. Buckle) – 4:00
 "You Don't Know Me" (J. Jones, P. Buckle, T. Deluca) – 3:46
 "Fare Thee Well" (P. Buckle) – 4:39
 "Let It Go" (P. Buckle) – 3:27
 "Can't Help Wanting To" (J. Jones, P. Buckle, T. Deluca) – 4:06
 "Don't Ask Me Why" (J. Jones, P. Buckle, T. Deluca) – 4:11

1996 Re-Release track listing
 "Zone" (J. Jones, P. Buckle, T. Deluca) – 4:23
 "Living Without You" J. Jones, P. Buckle) – 3:38
 "Don't Tell Me What's Right" (P. Buckle) – 3:57
 "Seeds" (P. Buckle, J. Jones, T. Deluca) – 3:21
 "Trust In Me" (P. Buckle) – 5:01
 "We Are One" (P. Buckle) – 4:00
 "You Don't Know Me" (J. Jones, P. Buckle, T. Deluca) – 3:46
 "Fare Thee Well" (P. Buckle) – 4:39
 "Let It Go" (P. Buckle) – 3:27
 "Can't Help Wanting To" (J. Jones, P. Buckle, T. Deluca) – 4:06
 "Pretend" (P. Buckle) – 3:54
 "Feels Right" (P. Buckle) – 4:11
 "Try" (P. Buckle) – 2:32
 "You Were There (Live)" (P. Buckle) – 3:40
 "Silent Witnesses (Live)" (P. Buckle) – 4:08
 "Hold Me In Your Arms (Live)" (P. Buckle) – 4:29

Personnel
Jack Jones – lead vocals, guitars
Phil Buckle – guitars, backing vocals
Virgil Donati – drums, keyboards
Geoff Cain – bass
Colin Hay – vocals on "Don't Tell Me What's Right"

References

Southern Sons albums
1996 albums